Kangnivi Ama Tchoutchoui (born 28 May 1994) is a Togolese footballer who plays as a centre-back for FC Nouadhibou and the Togo national team.

Career
Tchoutchoui began his senior career with the Togolese side Gbohloesu, before transferring to Mauritania with FC Nouadhibou on 1 December 2020.

International career
Tchoutchoui made his debut with the Togo national team in a 2–0 2020 African Nations Championship qualification loss to Nigeria on 19 October 2019.

References

External links
 
 

1994 births
Living people
Sportspeople from Lomé
Togolese footballers
Togo international footballers
FC Nouadhibou players
Super D1 players
Association football defenders
Togolese expatriate footballers
Togolese expatriates in Mauritania
Expatriate footballers in Mauritania
21st-century Togolese people